Hvare-khshaeta is the Avestan language name of the Zoroastrian yazata (divinity) of the "Radiant Sun."

Avestan Hvarə-xšaēta is a compound in which hvar "sun" has xšaēta "radiant" as a stock epithet. Avestan hvar derives from Proto-Indo-Iranian *súHar "sun", from which the Vedic Sanskrit theonym Surya also derives. In Middle Persian, Hvare-khshaeta was contracted to Khwarshēd, continuing in New Persian as Khurshēd/Khorshīd (cf. a similar contraction of Avestan Yima-khshaeta as Jamshid).

The short seven-verse 6th Yasht is dedicated to Hvare-khshaeta, as is also the Avesta's litany to the Sun. The 11th day of the Zoroastrian calendar is dedicated to and is under the protection of Hvare-khshaeta. Although in tradition Hvare-khshaeta would eventually be eclipsed by Mitra as the divinity of the Sun (this is attributed to "late" syncretic influences, perhaps to a conflation with Akkadian Shamash), in scripture the Sun is still unambiguously the domain of Hvare-khshaeta and remains distinct from the divinity of "Covenant."

The Slavic deity Hors has been generally considered to be etymologically related to Hvare-khshaeta, and possibly the result of Persian armies introducing their form of solar worship to Slavic peoples around the first millennium BC. However, this is not without criticism, as the etymological connection between both gods has been called into question.

See also
 List of solar deities

References

Yazatas
Solar gods
Ancient Iranian gods